Memphis Tigers baseball is the varsity intercollegiate team representing the University of Memphis in the sport of college baseball at the Division I level of the National Collegiate Athletic Association (NCAA). The team is led by Kerrick Jackson, and plays its home games at FedExPark on campus in Memphis, Tennessee.  The Tigers are members of the American Athletic Conference. Alumni of the program who have been Major League Baseball All-Stars include Tim McCarver and Dan Uggla.

References